Rötgesbüttel is a municipality in the district of Gifhorn, in Lower Saxony, Germany. It is a member municipality of the Samtgemeinde Papenteich

Geography

Neighbourhood
* distance from downtown

Geographical position
Rötgesbüttel is situated north of Braunschweig, between the Harz and the Lüneburg Heath. It is situated at the German federal road B4 and around 13 km to the north of the interchange Brunswick North (A2 /A391). Administrative it belongs to the district of Gifhorn. Other bigger towns nearby are: Wolfsburg, Salzgitter, Wolfenbüttel, Gifhorn, Peine and Celle.

History

The first documentary mentioning of Rötgesbüttel was in the year 1226. In former times the village was known as  Rotlekesbutle . As most of the so-called “-büttel” villages it is expected that Rötgesbüttel may erected earliest in 10th century. In the Middle Ages the crossing traffic of a trade road from Braunschweig to Hamburg influenced the villages development.

Politics

Municipal Council
The council of the Municipality Rötgesbüttel consists of 12 councilmen and woman:
 Christian Democratic Union 6 mandates
 Social Democratic Party 5 mandates

 Others  2 mandate

(Status: community election 10. September 2006 with a voter participation of 59,80%)

References

External links
 Samtgemeinde Papenteich

Gifhorn (district)